The LAV III, originally named the Kodiak by the Canadian Army, is the third generation of the Light Armoured Vehicle (LAV) family of armored personnel carriers built by General Dynamics Land Systems – Canada (GDLS-C), a London, Ontario, based subsidiary of General Dynamics. It first entered service in 1999, succeeding the LAV II. It is the primary mechanized infantry vehicle of both the Canadian Army and the New Zealand Army. It also forms the basis of the Stryker vehicle used by the U.S. Army and other operators. The Canadian Army is upgrading its LAV IIIs to the LAV 6 standard.

Development
By July 1991, the Canadian Armed Forces had identified the need to replace their aging fleet of 1960s and 1970s era armoured personnel carriers. As a result, $2.8 billion was earmarked for the Multi-Role Combat Vehicle (MRCV) project by the sitting Conservative government. The mandate of the MRCV project was to provide a series of vehicles based on a common chassis which would replace the M113 armored personnel carrier, Lynx reconnaissance vehicle, Grizzly armoured personnel carrier, and Bison armoured personnel carrier. The project was, however, deemed unaffordable and cancelled by March 1992.

By 1994, after the Liberal Party had returned to government, the army was still in need of new vehicles. As a result, the army embarked on the Light Armoured Vehicle Project, which would adapt parts of the MRCV Project, and be implemented incrementally to spread out the costs. Also, the requirement to replace the Bisons was dropped. The first phase of the project saw the selection of the LAV II Coyote Reconnaissance Vehicle to replace the Lynx.

General Motors Diesel proposed a upgraded variant of their 8×8 platform incorporating the turret and weapon system of the Coyote. In August 1995, it was announced that GM Diesel (later renamed GM Defense, and subsequently purchased by General Dynamics Land Systems of London, Ontario) had been awarded the contract to produce the LAV III which would replace the Grizzly and a large portion of the M113 armoured personnel carriers.

Design

Armament

The LAV III is fitted with a two-man turret, armed with the M242 Bushmaster 25 mm caliber chain gun and a coaxial 7.62-mm machine gun. One more 5.56 mm or 7.62 mm machine guns is positioned on top of the turret. The LAV III also has eight 76-mm grenade launchers in two clusters of four launchers positioned on each side of the turret. The grenade launchers are intended for smoke grenades. In 2009, a number of LAV III's were modified with a Nanuk remotely controlled weapon station (RCWS) to provide better protection and to increase the chances of survival of the crew against improvised explosive devices and anti-tank mine threats on the battlefield.

Mobility
The LAV III is powered by a Caterpillar 3126 diesel engine developing  and can reach speeds above 100 kilometres per hour. The vehicle is fitted with 8x8 drive and also equipped with a central tire inflation system, which allows it to adjust to different terrain, including off-road. The LAV III is fitted with a modern anti-locking brake system (ABS). Unlike earlier versions of the LAV, the LAV III does not have amphibious capabilities.

The LAV III faces the same concerns that most other wheeled military vehicles face. Like all wheeled armoured vehicles, the LAV III's ground pressure is inherently higher than a tracked vehicle with a comparable weight. This is because tires will have less surface area in contact with the ground when compared to a tracked vehicle. Higher ground pressure results in an increased likelihood of sinking into soft terrain such as mud, snow and sand, leading to the vehicle becoming stuck. The lower ground pressure and improved traction offered by tracked vehicles also gives them an advantage over vehicles like the LAV III when it comes to managing slopes, trenches, and other obstacles.

The LAV III can somewhat compensate for these effects by deflating its tires slightly, meaning that the surface area in contact with the ground increases, and the ground pressure is slightly lowered.

However, wheels offer several advantages over tracked vehicles, including lower maintenance for both the vehicle and road infrastructure, quieter movement for improved stealth, greater speed over good terrain, and higher ground clearance. Wheeled vehicle crews are also more likely to survive mine or IED attacks than the crew of a similarly armoured tracked vehicle.

The LAV III's turret gives the vehicle a higher centre of gravity than the vehicle was initially designed for. This has led to concerns that the vehicle is more likely to roll over on uneven terrain.

While there have been several recorded rollovers (about 16), the most common cause was found to be unstable terrain, specifically road shoulders unexpectedly giving away beneath the vehicle. The weight balance of the LAV III is taken into consideration during driver training, largely mitigating the chances of a rollover.

Protection
The basic armour of the LAV III, covering the Standardization Agreement STANAG 4569 level III, which provides all-round protection against 7.62×51mm NATO small calibre rounds. A ceramic appliqué armour (MEXAS) can be added, which protects against 14.5×114mm heavy calibre rounds from 500 meters. In December 2008 the Government of Canada awarded EODC Engineering, Developing and Licensing Inc. C$81.5 million worth of contracts to provide for add-on-armour kits, modules and spares for its LAV III wheeled armoured personnel carriers. This armour kit is intended to provide increased protection against improvised explosive devices (IED), explosively formed penetrators and 30 mm caliber armour piercing rounds. The LAV III can be also fitted with cage armour, which provides protection against shaped charges. The LAV III is fitted with a nuclear, biological, chemical (NBC) filtration system accompanied with a GID-3 chemical detector and AN/VDR-2 radiation detector systems. The LAV III was designed to produce a very low and very compact structure to minimize radar and IR-signatures. The LAV III also uses heat-absorbing filters to provide temporary protection against thermal imaging (TIS), image intensifiers and infrared cameras (IR). General Dynamics is in the process of integrating the LAV III with an active protection system based on the Israeli Trophy system.

The majority of Canadian casualties in Afghanistan have occurred during a patrol aboard a LAV III. This can be explained by the fact that the LAV III is the most commonly used Canadian armoured personnel carrier in theatre, and simply represents a normal association between use and likelihood to encounter a mine or improvised explosive device. The LAV III offers comparable or better protection than most other infantry carriers used in Afghanistan. In an effort to improve protection as a result of experiences in Afghanistan, future LAV III upgrades will likely include improved mine and IED protection.

Sights
The LAV III is equipped with a daytime optical Thermal Imaging System (TIS) and Generation III Image Intensification (II). The LAV III is equipped with a Tactical Navigation System (TacNav) to assist in navigation and target location tasks. The LAV III is equipped with an LCD monitor directly connected to the vehicle's external cameras, providing real-time images of the battlefield for the passengers.

Service history
The LAV III and related versions have been used in the following:

United Nations Mission in Ethiopia and Eritrea (UNMEE)
United Nations Mission in Kosovo (UNMIK)
United Nations Mission in Bosnia and Herzegovina (UNMIBH)
United Nations Mission in Haiti (UNMIH)
War in Afghanistan (ISAF)
Napier shootings, New Zealand
Operation Lotus, Canada
Response to the 2011 Christchurch earthquake, New Zealand
Colombian armed conflict

New Zealand

In May 2009, two NZLAVs were deployed to support police during the Napier shootings. They protected specialist police while retrieving the body of a deceased police officer from outside the offender's residence. In November 2009, it was announced that three NZLAVs would be deployed to assist NZSAS operations in Afghanistan and they were up-armoured. In 2011, these three LAVs were moved to Bamyan to support the provincial reconstruction team there as they were no longer needed in Kabul due to reduced SAS numbers. Five additional LAVs were also flown to Bamyan. One was later damaged by a roadside bomb. All these LAVs were returned to New Zealand by November 2013.

In 2011, after the Christchurch earthquake, LAVs from Burnham Camp were deployed to assist police with securing the inner city at night.

In March 2016, two LAVs were deployed to assist with lifting a siege near Kawerau in the Bay of Plenty after four policemen were shot at and severely injured.

Variants

 TOW Under Armour (TUA) – Standard LAV III turret replaced with TOW Under Armour launcher for anti-tank purposes
 Infantry Section Carrier (ISC) – Surplus LAV TUA hulls fitted with a Nanuk Remotely Controlled Weapon Station.
 Observation Post Vehicle (OPV) – Standard LAV III equipped for use by forward observation officer (FOO).
 Command Post Vehicle (CPV) – Standard LAV III equipped for command post duties.
 Engineer LAV (ELAV) – LAV III equipped with a dozer blade and other engineering equipment.
 Infantry Mobility Vehicle (IMV) – Standard NZLAV vehicle used in cavalry, reconnaissance, and forward observer roles.
 Light Obstacle Blade (LOB) – An NZLAV IMV fitted with a small blade for minor earth works and clearing of obstacles.
 Recovery (LAV-R) – NZLAV vehicle fitted with a TR200 winch and earth anchor for recovery operations.
 Multi-Mission Effects Vehicle (MMEV) – The project was canceled in 2005

LAV 6

In October 2011, GDLS-Canada was awarded a contract to upgrade 409 of the service's 651 LAV III APCs to the LAV 6 standard. Four variants were ordered: an infantry section carrier, a command post, an observation post and an engineer vehicle. The upgrade was expected to extend the service life of the vehicle to 2035. In February 2017, the service awarded GDLS-Canada a $404 million contract to upgrade 141 more LAV IIIs. In August 2019, GDLS-Canada received a four-year, $3 billion deal to build 360 armoured combat support vehicle variants. The first of these rolled off the assembly line in May 2021.

Operators

 
 Canadian Army – 651
 2017 February 10, Canadian defence minister Harjit Sajjan announced a CAD404 million (USD309 million) investment to upgrade the chassis of an additional 141 light armoured vehicles (LAVs). The upgrade will increase the LAVs' mobility, protection, and information management systems.
 
 Chilean Marine Corps – 22 NZLAVs.
 
 Colombian Army – 32
On December 27, 2012, the Colombian Army selected the LAV III to equip its mechanized infantry units. The vehicles are on order from General Dynamics Land Systems to partially replace their M113s and gradually replace the EE-11 Urutu. They will be armed with the Samson RWS with M2 Browning machine guns or 25 or 30 mm cannons. The contract was officially signed on January 10, 2013 for the order of 24 vehicles worth $65.3 million. They will have the double v-hull design and add-on armor to provide protection against mine blasts, IEDs, and other threats. Deliveries are to be completed by May 2014. Colombia is considering ordering 9–12 more vehicles. 8 LAV IIIs were acquired in January 2014.

 
 New Zealand Army – 73 NZLAVs operational
 
 Saudi Arabian National Guard – 19
 Saudi Arabia will receive 900 modified LAV-III, known as the LAV VI (marketed as the LAV "6.0"), for 15 billion dollars. Some of the 900 combat vehicles will be fitted with an autoloading 105 mm anti-tank gun, known as the Cockerill CT-CV 105HP Weapon System (gun and turret). This weapon can also fire a Falarick 105 missile, which can hit a target at distances up to 5,000 m and can perforate up to 550 mm of armour. The rest will be fitted with a CPWS 20-25-30, which can be armed from a 20 mm to a 30 mm autocanon and 150 ready to fire munition.
 
 Royal Thai Army – In May 2019 Royal Thai Army ordered 37 refurbished LAV-III derived M1126 Infantry Carrier Vehicles from U.S. Army and will also receive 23 more M1126 vehicles. Around 60 Strykers were delivered to Bangkok via C-17s with an option to include 30 more Strykers free of charge while Thai military personnel will be trained in the US to learn about operating the vehicles.

  
U.S. Army – The US army operates LAV III derived Stryker, ordered from General Dynamics Land Systems Canada in 2000, with delivery of 4,466 completing in 2014.

Retired LAV III on display

 Highway of Heroes Durham LAV Monument in Bowmanville, Ontario – a retired Canadian Army LAV III located at Clarington Fields.
 The Afghanistan Repatriation Memorial in Trenton, Ontario – a retired Canadian Army LAV III was dedicated in 2016.
 The LAV III Monument at the Seaforth Armoury in Vancouver, dedicated in 2017.
 The Hamilton / Afghanistan War Monument – in Hamilton, Ontario – a retired Canadian Army LAV III located at the Canadian Warplane Heritage Museum was dedicated in 2017.
 The LAV III Monument at Fort York Armoury in Toronto, Ontario. A retired Canadian Army LAV III was dedicated in 2018.
 The B.C. Regiment (DCO) LAV III Monument at Shiloh Hill, Mission, B.C. was dedicated in 2019 to commemorate the Canadian Mission 2001 - 2014 in Afghanistan.  The British Columbia Regiment (DCO) Association -Home and Newsletter.
 The LAV III Monument at Parc de la Paix (Peace Parc) in Rivière-à-Claude, Gaspésie, Québec. A retired Canadian Army LAV III dedicated in 2019.
 Afghanistan Memorial LAV III in Victoria Park, in Sarnia, Ontario, Canada.
 Oromocto, New Brunswick. A LAV III monument dedicated in 2016.
 The War Memorial Peace Park in Aurora, Ontario
 Canada Company LAV III Memorial in Waterloo, Ontario.

Related vehicles
 General Motors LAV
 AVGP
 LAV II
 ASLAV
 LAV-25

References

External links 

 GDLS Canada LAV III website
 Canadian Army LAV III specifications
 New Zealand Army NZLAV page
 Prime Portal – LAV III walk-around (1)
 Prime Portal – LAV III walk-around (2)
 Prime Portal – LAV III C2 walk-around
 Prime Portal – LAV III TUA walk-around
 Prime Portal – ELAV walk-around
 -LAV-III Engineer Walk Around

Armoured personnel carriers
Armoured fighting vehicles of Canada
General Dynamics land vehicles
Wheeled infantry fighting vehicles
Eight-wheeled vehicles
Military vehicles introduced in the 1990s
Wheeled armoured personnel carriers
Mowag Piranha